Heidi 4 Paws is a feature-length children's film that retells the classic story of Heidi using dogs in all the acting roles. Heidi 4 Paws was syndicated to public television stations in the United States through American Public Television and WTTW Chicago in November/December 2008.

Based on the 1881 novel of the little Swiss orphan by Johanna Spyri, Heidi 4 Paws closely follows the original 1880 best-selling novel, but with a canine twist. The young Heidi is sent to live with her reclusive Grandfather high in the Alps. Just as Heidi adjusts to her new life in the mountains, she is taken away by her social worker. Heidi finds herself living in the big city with Clara Sesehound, who has been made an invalid after a debilitating illness. Although Heidi comes to love Clara, her quest to return to the mountains dominates her stay. In the end, she is able to reunite with her beloved Grandfather. When Clara later comes to visit, she miraculously regains her ability to walk.

Heidi 4 Paws is the first in an intended series of eight films that retell classic stories with live action dogs playing all the roles.

Origins
Inspired by the 1930s MGM shorts, Dogville Comedies, children's television series such as Wishbone, and the family film Babe, writer/director Holly Goldberg Sloan (Angels in the Infield, and The Big Green) created the 4 Paws brand as a way to revitalize classic literature for a new generation.

Three partners, Tim Goldberg, Tim Ellis, and Chuck Sloan, joined forces to create Goldberg Sloan, and made Heidi 4 Paws independently, without financial support from a major studio. The film took over four years to make, and features a blend of live action photography, 3D animation and visual effects.

Characters
 Heidi: a golden Labrador puppy, Heidi is a precocious orphan who is abandoned into the care of her gruff Grandfather
 Grandfather: a crusty sheepdog, Grandfather is an Alpine hermit whose life is changed by the love of his little grandpuppy, Heidi
 Peter the Goatherd: a whippet, Peter the Goatherd is in charge of caring for Grandfather's goats, Daisy and Dusky. He becomes Heidi's first real friend
 Clara Sesehound: a cockapoo mix, Clara is a wealthy invalid who asks her father for a companion and gets more than she bargained for in Heidi
 Grandmamma Sesehound: a kind Labrador, Grandmamma brings peace to the Sesehound household and teaches Heidi how to read
 Detie: a beagle, Detie is Heidi's social worker.
 Sebastian: an apricot poodle, Sebastian is the butler in the Sesehound household
 The Doctor: a lovable old terrier, the Doctor is a good family friend of the Sesehound's whose kindness to Heidi helps to diagnose her chronic homesickness
 Miss Rottenmeier: Clara's strict and fussy governess who takes an immediate disliking to Heidi but when Heidi leaves, she misses her and catches a cold
 Mr. Sesehound: a German Shepherd, Mr. Sesehound is Clara's often absent but well-meaning father

Cast
 Meghan Strange - voice of Heidi
 Richard Kind - voice of Grandfather
 Julian Sands - voice of Peter the Goatherd
 Kimberly Beck - voice of Clara Sesehound
 Angela Lansbury - voice of Grandmamma Sesehound
 Joanne Baron - voice of Detie
 Steve Guttenberg - voice of Sebastian
 Stephen Rea - voice of The Doctor
 Majandra Delfino - voice of Miss Rottenmeier
 Marshall Bell - voice of Mr. Sesehound
 Mike Fishburn - voice of Mr. Usher the teacher

Other
Sixteen different dogs have roles in the film. All but two of the sixteen dogs were rescue animals, coming from local animal shelters. Only the title role of Heidi, played by eight-week-old purebred yellow lab puppies, and an apricot poodle playing the butler Sebastian, were from breeders. The title character of Heidi was played by nine different puppies. Since the dogs grew as filming progressed, they were only able to work for a week at a time before they had outgrown their role and their costumes.

References
 Teamer, Shaunese. WTTW National Productions Presents Heidi 4 Paws: A Furry Tale.
 Bates, Samantha. Elmira Siblings Give Voice to Singing Canines.
 Bickett, Iris. "Who, who, who let the dogs out." The Breeze, October 2004.
 4 Paws Entertainment

External links
 
 Heidi 4 Paws at American Public Television

2008 television films
2008 films
American television films
Films about dogs
Heidi films
2000s children's fantasy films
Television series by WTTW
Films directed by Holly Goldberg Sloan
2009 films
2000s English-language films